Major-General Hugh Alastair Borradaile,  (1 June 1907 – 13 December 1993) was a British Army officer.

Military career
Borradaile was commissioned into the Devonshire Regiment on 30 August 1926. He commanded the 5th Battalion, the East Lancashire Regiment and then the 7th Battalion, the Somerset Light Infantry during the Normandy campaign in the Second World War.

After the war he became Assistant Chief of Staff, Allied Control Commission Germany in 1945, commanding officer of the 1st Battalion, the Devonshire Regiment in 1946 and Deputy Chief of Intelligence Division, Allied Control Commission Germany in 1948. He went on to become became Chief Administration Officer, Anti-Aircraft Command in October 1951, commander of 24th Infantry Brigade in September 1953 and Deputy Military Secretary at the War Office in July 1955. After that he became General Officer Commanding 43rd (Wessex) Infantry Division in October 1957 and Vice Adjutant-General at the War Office in February 1960 before retiring in March 1963.

He was appointed a Companion of the Order of the Bath in the 1959 Birthday Honours and was honorary colonel of the Devonshire and Dorset Regiment from 1962 to 1967.

In retirement he was Master of the Worshipful Company of Drapers from 1971 to 1972.

References

External links
Generals of World War II

1907 births
1993 deaths
British Army major generals
Companions of the Order of the Bath
Companions of the Distinguished Service Order
Devonshire Regiment officers
British Army brigadiers of World War II
Graduates of the Royal Military College, Sandhurst